The  is a system in Japan that allows taxpayers who live in urban areas to contribute to rural areas in return for a credit from income tax and residence tax. Its creation was announced by the Minister for Internal Affairs and Communications Yoshihide Suga under Prime Minister Shinzo Abe in 2007. On July 5, 2014, Abe's then chief cabinet secretary Suga announced that they had established the preparatory office for the “local headquarters”.

The local headquarters was established to help increase the number of children, especially in rural areas, and to promote development of self-governing bodies. Promoting “hometown tax” is included in these activities.

History 
In the spring of 2008 the "Hometown tax" law was legislated in Japan.

Function 
Taxpayers who contribute more than 2000 yen can have their income tax and residence tax reduced. The amount deducted is the taxpayer's entire contribution minus 2000 yen and set amount. To receive the subtraction, the taxpayer files a final tax return.　Many young people move to urban areas, leaving fewer people to pay rural taxes. Taxpayers choose the receiving jurisdiction.

Evaluations 
Cities that offered "gifts" of local products received up to 60 million yen. 

The use of gifts has been criticized as distorting the results: for example, an effective donation of just 2000 yen [as anything above this is merely a redirection of the donor's tax from central to regional government] can net the donor 60 kg of rice, equivalent to one adult's annual consumption.

Cities that have no specialty products or have no means to announce their activity received fewer contributions.

Yamagata prefecture 
In Yamagata Prefecture contributions have been increasing. For example, Obanazawa city and Mogami town received several million yen in 2013. They use gifts and the Internet to collect contributions. For example, Obanazawa, Yamagata offered gifts of “Obanazawa watermelon” and “sirloin steak of Obanazawa-gyū”.

References 

Taxation in Japan